Eiksund is a village in the municipality of Ulstein, in Møre og Romsdal county, Norway. It is located on the southern tip of the island of Hareidlandet. The small island of Eika lies just off the shore from Eiksund.

History
Since 1838, Eiksund was administratively a part of the municipality of Sande, despite being separated from the rest of Sande by the sea (see formannskapsdistrikt law).  On 1 January 1889, the Eiksund area and the island of Eika (population: 119) were transferred to Herøy.  Then on 1 January 1964, Eiksund and Eika (population: 222) were transferred to Ulstein.

Transportation
Until 2008, Eiksund was connected to Rjåneset in the neighbouring municipality of Ørsta on the mainland by a ferry, since there were no road connections to Eiksund on the island of Hareidlandet. In 2005, the Eiksund Bridge connected Eiksund to the nearby island of Eika. On 23 February 2008, the Eiksund Tunnel was opened by the Norwegian Minister of Transport and Communications, Liv Signe Navarsete. The undersea tunnel connects Eika (and thus Eiksund) to the mainland in Ørsta.

References

Villages in Møre og Romsdal
Ulstein